The Commander of the Yugoslav Navy was the highest ranking officer and official head of the Royal Yugoslav Navy and its successor.

List of commanders

Kingdom of Serbs, Croats and Slovenes (1918–1929)

Kingdom of Yugoslavia (1929–1945)

Socialist Federal Republic of Yugoslavia (1945–1992)

References

Yugoslav Navy
Military of Yugoslavia
Yugoslavia